Friedrich Meinecke (October 20, 1862 – February 6, 1954) was a German historian, with national liberal and anti-Semitic views, who supported the Nazi invasion of Poland. After World War II, as a representative of an older tradition, he criticized the Nazi regime, but continued to express anti-Semitic prejudices.

In 1948, he helped to found the Free University of Berlin in West Berlin, and remained an important figure to the end of his life.

Life

Meinecke was born in Salzwedel in the Province of Saxony. He was educated at the University of Bonn and the University of Berlin. In 1887–1901 he worked as an archivist at the German State Archives. A professor at the University of Strasbourg, he served as editor of the journal Historische Zeitschrift between 1896 and 1935 and was the chairman of the Historische Reichskommission from 1928 to 1935. As a nationalist historian, Meinecke had little regard for the wishes of peoples in Eastern Europe, and he went as far as writing about "raw bestiality of the south Slavs", while favoring German expansionism into the East.

During the First World War, he advocated removing Polish landowners from the Prussian provinces of West Prussia and Posen, which had been acquired from Poland during the Partitions of Poland, to Congress Poland. In addition, he proposed the German colonization of Courland after the expulsion of its Latvian population. Some authors have likened his views to ethnic cleansing. When the German Empire formulated the so-called Polish Border Strip plan, which called for the annexation of a large swathe of land from Congress Poland and the removal of millions of Poles and Jews to make room for German settlers, Meinecke welcomed the idea with contentment.

Meinecke was best known for his work on 18th- and 19th-century German intellectual and cultural history. The book that made his reputation was his 1908 work Weltbürgertum und Nationalstaat (Cosmopolitanism and the National State), which traced the development of national feelings in the 19th century. Starting with Die Idee der Staatsräson (1924), much of his work concerns the conflict between Kratos (power) and Ethos (morality) and how to achieve a balance between them.

One of his students was Heinrich Brüning, the future Chancellor. Under the Weimar Republic, Meinecke was a Vernunftsrepublikaner (republican by reason), someone who supported the republic as the least bad alternative. In 1918 he had been one of the founders of the German Democratic Party.

Under the Third Reich, Meinecke had some sympathy for the regime, especially in regard to its early anti-semitic laws. After 1935, Meinecke fell into a state of semi-disgrace, and was removed as editor of the Historische Zeitschrift. Though Meinecke remained in public a supporter of the regime, he privately became increasingly bothered by what he regarded as the violence and crudeness of the Nazis. Nevertheless, he openly described himself as "anti-Semitic", and while he was willing to have Jewish friends and colleagues, the Nazi persecution of Jews never bothered him much.

After the German invasion of Poland in 1939, he praised it on a letter to Siegfred August Kaehler: "You will also have been delighted by this splendid campaign".

One of Meinecke's best-known books, Die Deutsche Katastrophe (The German Catastrophe) of 1946, sees the historian attempting to reconcile his lifelong belief in authoritarian state power with the events of 1933–45. His explanation for the success of Nazism points to the legacy of Prussian militarism in Germany, the effects of rapid industrialisation and the weaknesses of the middle classes, but Meinecke also asserts that Hitlerism benefited from a series of unfortunate accidents, which had no connection with the earlier developments in German history. Meinecke interpreted Nazism as an "alien force occupying Germany", and he also expressed prejudice against Jews. Meinecke claimed that Jews were responsible for anti-Semitism and blamed them for the fall of liberalism. The German catastrophe represented two classic themes of anti-Semitism: resentment based on Jewish economic activities and their alleged "character".

In 1948, Meinecke helped to found the Free University of Berlin.

British historian E. H. Carr cites him as an example of a historian whose views are heavily influenced by the Zeitgeist: liberal during the German Empire, discouraged during the interwar period and deeply pessimistic after World War II.

Works
Das Leben des Generalfeldmarschalls Hermann von Boyen (2 volumes, 1896–1899) (The Life of Field Marshal Hermann von Boyen)
Das Zeitalter der deutschen Erhebung, 1795–1815 (1906) (The Coming of Age of Germany). Translated into English by Peter Paret as The Age of German Liberation, 1795–1815 (full view on Google Books), based on the 6th German edition, 1957. Berkeley: University of California Press, 1977, 
Weltbürgertum und Nationalstaat: Studien zur Genesis des deutschen Nationalstaates (1908) (Cosmopolitanism and the Nationstate: Studies in the Beginning of the German Nationstates)
Radowitz und die deutsche Revolution (1913) (Radowitz and the German Revolution)
Die Idee der Staatsräson in der neueren Geschichte (1924) (The Idea of Reason of State in Modern History)
Geschichte des deutsch-englischen Bündnisproblems, 1890–1901 (1927) (The History of German-English Partnership Problems)
Staat und Persönlichkeit (1933) (State and Personality)
Die Entstehung des Historismus (2 volumes, 1936) (Historism: The Rise of a New Historical Outlook)
Die deutsche Katastrophe: Betrachtungen und Erinnerungen (1946) (The German Catastrophe: Contemplations and Recollections)
1848: Eine Säkularbetrachtung (1948) (1848: The Year in Review)
Werke (9 volumes, 1957–1979) (Works)

Notes

References
 Beiser, Frederick C., After Hegel: German Philosophy, 1840–1900, Princeton University Press, 2014.
 Daum, Andreas, Hartmut Lehmann, James Sheehan (eds.), The Second Generation: Émigrés from Nazi Germany as Historians. With a Biobibliographic Guide. New York: Berghahn Books, 2016, .
 Erbe, Michael (editor), Friedrich Meinecke heute: Bericht über ein Gedenk-Colloquium zu seinem 25. Todestag am 5. und 6. April 1979, Berlin: Colloquium Verlag, 1981.
 Hofer, Walther, Geschichtsschreibung und Weltanschauung; Betrachtungen zum Werk Friedrich Meineckes, Munich: Oldenbourg, 1950.
 Iggers, George, The German Conception of History: The National Tradition of Historical Thought from Herder to the Present, Middletwon, CT: Wesleyan University Press, 1968, revised edition, 1983.
 Lehmann, Hartmut and James J. Sheehan (eds.), An Interrupted Past: German-Speaking Refugee Historians in the United States after 1933. Washington, D.C.: German Historical Institute, 1991.
 Meineke, Stefan, Friedrich Meinecke: Persönlichkeit und politisches Denken bis zum Ende des Ersten Weltkrieges, Berlin: de Gruyter, 1995.
 Pois, Robert, Friedrich Meinecke and German Politics in the Twentieth Century, Berkeley: University of California Press, 1972.
 Schulin, Ernst, "Friedrich Meinecke", in Deutsche Historiker, edited by Hans-Ulrich Wehler, Göttingen: Vandenhoeck & Ruprecht, 1971.
 Sterling, Richard, Ethics in a World of Power: The Political Ideas of Friedrich Meinecke, Princeton: Princeton University Press, 1958.

External links

Friedrich Meinecke Cosmopolitanism and the National State.
 
 
 

1862 births
1954 deaths
People from Salzwedel
People from the Province of Saxony
German Democratic Party politicians
German philosophers
Historians of Nazism
Scholars of nationalism
German male non-fiction writers
20th-century German historians
Antisemitism in Germany
University of Bonn alumni
Humboldt University of Berlin alumni
Academic staff of the Humboldt University of Berlin
Academic staff of the University of Strasbourg
Academic staff of the University of Freiburg
Academic staff of the Free University of Berlin
Members of the Prussian Academy of Sciences
Recipients of the Pour le Mérite (civil class)